Catuípe is a municipality of the western part of the state of Rio Grande do Sul, Brazil. The population is 8,701 (2020 est.) in an area of 583.26 km². Its nickname is Land of Spring Water for the springs located around the municipality. It is located 419 km west of the state capital of Porto Alegre, northeast of Alegrete.

Bordering municipalities

Santo Ângelo 
Giruá
Independência
Inhacorá
Chiapeta
Ijuí
Coronel Barros 
Entre-Ijuís

References

External links
https://web.archive.org/web/20070930204221/http://www.citybrazil.com.br/rs/catuipe/ 

Municipalities in Rio Grande do Sul